{| 

{{Infobox ship characteristics
|Hide header=
|Header caption= 
|Ship type=Nuclear attack submarine
|Ship displacement=*Sierra I:
7,200 tons (surfaced)
8,300 tons (submerged)
Sierra II:
7,600 tons (surfaced)
9,100 tons (submerged)
|Ship length=*Sierra I: 
Sierra II: 
|Ship beam=*Sierra I: 
Sierra II: 
|Ship height=
|Ship draft=*Sierra I: Sierra II: 
|Ship power=
|Ship propulsion=*Sierra I & II: 1 × PWR, 190 MW (HEU <= 45%)
2 ×  emergency motors
1 shaft, 2 spinners
|Ship speed=*Sierra I & II:  (surfaced)Sierra I:  (submerged)Sierra II:  (submerged)
|Ship range=Effectively unlimited, except by food supplies
|Ship endurance=
|Ship test depth=
|Ship complement=Sierra I & II: 61 & 72
|Ship sensors=
|Ship EW=
|Ship armament=*Sierra I & II:2 ×  torpedo tubes (only Sierra I)
4 ×  torpedo tubes ( 6 x Sierra II)
SS-N-21 Sampson SLCM
SS-N-15 Starfish anti-submarine weapon: 200 kt depth charge or 90 kg HE Type 40 torpedo
SS-N-16 Stallion, 200 kt depth charge or 90 kg HE Type 40 torpedo
Minelaying configuration: 42 mines instead of torpedoes
|Ship notes=
}}
|}

The Sierra class, Soviet designations Project 945 Barrakuda and Project 945A Kondor, (NATO reporting names Sierra I and Sierra II' respectively), are a series of nuclear-powered attack submarines intended for the Soviet Navy and currently in service with the Russian Navy.

The class is unique due to its light and strong titanium pressure hull which enables the submarines of the class to dive to greater depths, reduce the level of radiated noise and increase resistance to torpedo attacks. It is powered by a single OK-650 pressurized water reactor.

The upgraded version, the Sierra II class was specifically developed for search and destroy missions against US nuclear submarines. It has speeds and diving depth greater than its American counterparts at the time it was designed. It has also improved quieting and sonar.

Versions

Project 945 Barrakuda (Sierra I)

The first submarine of the Project 945, Carp, was laid down in July 1979 at the Gorky shipyard and was launched in August 1983 before being transferred to Severodvinsk for fitting out. It was laid up in 1997. The next hull to be built was Kostroma, which was launched in July 1986 and was commissioned in September 1987. K-276 Kostroma was put into a drydock after its 11 February 1992 collision with the US submarine  in the Barents Sea, off Kildin Island. The submarine was repaired on 3 June 1992 and was renamed Krab on 6 April 1993, but in 1996 its original name Kostroma was restored. The Sierra I class was also fitted with a releasable escape pod for the crew. The pod is covered by a V-shaped casing on the port side of the sail.

Project 945A Kondor (Sierra II)

The Project 945A has a considerably larger sail which is  longer than the Sierra I class. The sail also has a curious flat, square leading edge. The masts are offset on the starboard side to make way for two escape pods in the sail. The starboard side also has a 10-point environment sensor fitted at right angles to the front end of the sail. Also, the Sierra II class has a much larger pod on its after fin. The pod houses the Skat 3 passive very low frequency towed sonar array.

Of the two existing submarines of type Sierra II, the Pskov was in overhaul between 2011 and 2015 according to the Russian website Deep storm. The aforementioned website acknowledges activity of Nizhniy Novgorod under the command of Captain 1st Rank Alexey Ananko at in both 2008 and 2013.

Both Nizhniy Novgorod and Pskov took part in large exercise in October 2019.

Project 945AB (Sierra III)

The single submarine of the Project 945AB was laid down in March 1990 but was scrapped in November 1993 before completion.

Aborted Barrakuda (Sierra I) modernization
Modernization of the Carp and Kostroma of Project 945 for the Russian Navy was anticipated in the 2010s, but in the event, was not completed.  A January 2013 contract for refit and recommission of the two submarines was signed with the Zvezdochka Shipyard, Severodvinsk, with the refit expected to take three years. Originally expected that the submarines would be transferred to Zvezdochka before end of April 2013 with the overhaul beginning in summer 2013.  Plans included that Zvezdochka would carry out the refit, repair mechanical parts, and replace nuclear fuel and all electrical equipment of the submarines. The submarines were also expected to receive a new sonar, combat information management system (BIUS), the GLONASS navigation system and new armament consisting of the Kalibr cruise missiles. However, in March 2015 it was reported that the final decision on the modernization of submarines Carp and Kostroma'' had not yet been made due to cost issues.

Units

See also
 List of Soviet and Russian submarine classes
 List of submarine classes in service
 Future of the Russian Navy
 Attack submarine
 Cruise missile submarine

References

Further reading

945 Барракуда (945 Barracuda) at Энциклопедия кораблей [Encyclopedia of Ships] 

 
 
Russian and Soviet navy submarine classes
Submarine classes
Nuclear submarines of the Soviet Navy